The 1995 All-Ireland Minor Football Championship was the 64th staging of the All-Ireland Minor Football Championship, the Gaelic Athletic Association's premier inter-county Gaelic football tournament for boys under the age of 18.

Kerry entered the championship as defending champions, however, they were defeated by Cork in the Munster semi-final replay.

On 17 September 1995, Westmeath won the championship following a 1-10 to 0-11 defeat of Derry in the All-Ireland final. This was their first All-Ireland title.

Results

Connacht Minor Football Championship

Quarter-Final

Semi-Finals

Final

Leinster Minor Football Championship

Preliminary Round

Quarter-Finals

Semi-Finals

Final

Munster Minor Football Championship

Quarter-Finals

Semi-Finals
	

Final

Ulster Minor Football Championship

Preliminary Round

Quarter-Finals

Semi-Finals

Final

All-Ireland Minor Football Championship

Semi-Finals

Final

Championship statistics

Miscellaneous

 The All-Ireland final between Westmeath and Derry is the first ever championship meeting between the two teams.

References

1995
All-Ireland Minor Football Championship